Yanajirca or Yana Hirka (Quechua yana black, Ancash Quechua hirka mountain, "black mountain", also spelled Yanajirca)  is a mountain in the Andes of Peru which reaches an altitude of approximately . It is located in the Ancash Region, Bolognesi Province, Huallanca District. Yana Hirka lies southeast of the Wallanka mountain range.

References 

Mountains of Peru
Mountains of Ancash Region